Kuknoor (also known as Kuknur, Kukkanur or Kukanoor) is a town in Kukanoor taluk in the Koppal District of the Indian state of Karnataka, which is located about 40 km northwest of Hospet and 7 km from the Mahadeva Temple in Itagi. Kuknoor is known for the temples of the Rashtrakutas and Chalukyas in the town, with the most notable being the Navalinga Temple.

History
Kuknoor was an important town during the Middle Ages, and features many historical ruins, including those of the Navalinga Temples that were completed in the later Chalukya style of architecture during the 8th to 13th centuries A.D. Other important sites include the Kalleshvara and Mallikarjuna temples.

Demographics
As of the 2011 Census of India, Kuknoor had a population of 18,033, constituting 9,075 males and 8,958 females.

Temples
Kuknur is home to several important temples.

Mahamaya Temple
Mahamaya Temple is located in the center of the town, and is mentioned in the Indian epic Mahabharata. The temple is dedicated to three deities of the Garbhagriha, and features statues of them. Two of the deities are female;  Mahakali& Mahamaya, and one male; Kshetrapala.  All 3 statues face south, in contrast to the regular orientation towards the north. Statues like these, which face south are often considered to be more powerful.

This temple was mentioned in the Mahabharata, which suggests it was constructed before the 8th century B.C. According to legend, there exists a hidden underground temple dedicated to Kali below the Mahamaya Temple. This temple plays a role in the events of the epic, as it practices Narabali, a type of human sacrifice. In modern history, there were plans to unearth it, however they were cancelled after villagers protested, citing the possible release of evil spirits if it were to be uncovered.

Gudneshwar Temple
Located near Kuknoor and surrounded by Tamarind trees, the Gudneshwar (Rudramunishwar) Temple is dedicated to Rudramunishwar, a figure who practiced social welfare work during the 12th century and was later known as Gudneshwar.

Education

Jawahar Navodaya Vidyalaya, Kuknoor
Jawahar Navodaya Vidyalaya (JNV) Kuknoor is located near Gudneppanamath and is a premier educational institution. It is funded by the Government of India's Ministry of Human Resource Development. It was established in 1987 to provide education to rural students in Raichur district. The campus covers 35 acres in Kuknoor. The school is affiliated with India’s Central Board of Secondary Education and provides for grades 6-12.

Vidyananda Gurukul Educational trust, Kukanoor
This trust is located in Kukanoor, Yelburga Main road. It was founded by RB DESAI in 1921. This institute contains both Kannada and English Medium School 1st to 10th, Diploma, PUC and Degree. It has buildings, infrastructure, a garden and a play ground.

Kuknoor Granite 
Himalayan Blue Granite is mined in quarries in and around Kuknoor.

Transport
Kuknoor is well connected by road to Koppal, Yelburga, and Gadag-Betageri.  The nearest major airport is in Hubli.

Bus
The nearby city of Koppal provides bus service to major cities such as Bangalore, Hubli, Hyderabad, Bagalkot, and others. Karnataka State Road Transport Corporation (KSRTC) has a bus depot in Kuknoor that runs service to other cities and villages.

Rail
The closest railway station to Kuknoor is 12 km away at Bhanapur, while the railway station at Koppal is 25 km away.

See also 
 Koppal District
 Mahadeva Temple (Itagi)
 Gajendragad
 Sudi
 Lakkundi
 Gadag
 North Karnataka
 Tourism in North Karnataka

References

External links 

Villages in Koppal district
History of Karnataka